Joseph Edward Carter (August 15, 1875 – June 19, 1950) was an American sailor serving in the United States Navy during the Spanish–American War who received the Medal of Honor for bravery.

Biography

He died June 19, 1950, and was buried at Arlington National Cemetery, Arlington, Virginia.

Medal of Honor citation
Rank and organization: Blacksmith, U.S. Navy. Born: 15 August 1875, Manchester, England. Accredited: North Dakota. G.O. No.: 521, 7 July 1899.

Citation:

On board the U.S.S. Marblehead during the operation of cutting the cable leading from Cienfuegos, Cuba, 11 May 1898. Facing the heavy fire of the enemy, Carter set an example of extraordinary bravery and coolness throughout this action.

See also

 List of Medal of Honor recipients for the Spanish–American War

References

External links
 
 Joseph Edward Carter at ArlingtonCemetery.net, an unofficial website

1875 births
1950 deaths
United States Navy Medal of Honor recipients
United States Navy sailors
People from North Dakota
English emigrants to the United States
American military personnel of the Spanish–American War
English-born Medal of Honor recipients
Burials at Arlington National Cemetery
Spanish–American War recipients of the Medal of Honor